Scars of the Soul Are Why Kids Wear Bandages When They Don't Have Bruises is a 2004 collection of essays by Miles Marshall Lewis. It was published by Akashic Books.

Contents
I. Memory Lanes, Gun Hill Roads
Bronx Science
Famous Negro Writer #77
The Suckerpunch of My Childhood Files
Mama's Gun
Worldwide Underground

II. The Def of Hiphop
Peace, Unity, Love, Having Fun
Notes Toward a Hiphop Politick
Appeared first in 2003 in The Nation under the title "Russell Simmons's Rap."
Spelmo Babies and Other Bourgeois Ephemera
Appeared first in 1997 in LA Weekly under the title "All About the Benjamins."
Go Make of All Disciples
Scars of the Soul Are Why Kids Wear Bandages When They Don't Have Bruises
Another Great Day in Harlem
Appeared first in 1998 in XXL under the title "Hip-Hop America."

References

2004 non-fiction books
Essay collections
Popular culture books
Akashic Books books